The Firebrand is a 1922 American silent Western film directed by Alan James. The film stars Franklyn Farnum, Ruth Langdon, and Fred Gamble.

Cast
 Franklyn Farnum as Bill Holt
 Ruth Langdon as Alice Acker
 Fred Gamble as Judd Acker
 Pat Harmon as Hank Potter
 William Berke as Sheriff Harding
 Tex Keith as Buck Knowles

References

1922 films
1922 Western (genre) films
American black-and-white films
Silent American Western (genre) films
Films directed by Alan James
1920s American films